Bhankhar is a village in Unjha Taluka of Mahesana district in Gujarat, India.

Places of interest
There is an Dargha of Sayyed Families is an ancient Hindu temple dedicated to Agiya Vaital as well as a temple of Vishnu.

Amentites
The village has a primary school and a post office.

References

Villages in Mehsana district